Qi Dong is a Chinese powerlifter. He won the silver medal at the Men's 97 kg event at the 2016 Summer Paralympics, with 233 kilograms.

References

External links
 

Year of birth missing (living people)
Living people
Chinese powerlifters
Male powerlifters
Paralympic powerlifters of China
Paralympic silver medalists for China
Paralympic medalists in powerlifting
Powerlifters at the 2008 Summer Paralympics
Powerlifters at the 2012 Summer Paralympics
Powerlifters at the 2016 Summer Paralympics
Medalists at the 2008 Summer Paralympics
Medalists at the 2012 Summer Paralympics
Medalists at the 2016 Summer Paralympics
Sportspeople from Anshan
21st-century Chinese people